Farida Mohammad Kabir (born 25 July 1992) is a Nigerian epidemiologist, software developer, and technology entrepreneur. She is the team lead for Google Women TechMakers and co-organizer for Google Developer Group, Abuja. She is also the founder/CEO of  OTRAC, a health technology company that develops enterprise software systems for the healthcare sector in Nigeria.

Early life and education 
Farida Kabir was born in London, UK, in 1992. She is the eldest of five daughters. Kabir attended primary school in Lagos and secondary school in Kaduna Nigeria. She studied at Ahmadu Bello University, Zaria, Nigeria from January 2009 to April 2014, graduating with a Bachelors of Science in Biological Science. In 2015, she was trained as a front line field epidemiologist by the Nigeria Field Epidemiology and Laboratory Training Program of the NCDC. She later got a scholarship from the Visiola Foundation to study software development. Kabir also holds an MBA from the International Finance Corporation of the World Bank.

Career 
Kabir started her career in public health as a data analyst with the Nigeria Centre for Disease Control (NCDC) during the 2014 - 2015 Ebola outbreak in the country. She has also worked with the Lassa fever emergency operations center as the assistant communications officer under the social mobilization and communications unit of the NCDC.

In 2016, she went back to study software development through a scholarship awarded by the Visiola Foundation. She went ahead to intern at hotels.ng, a software company owned by Mark Essien. She has worked on various software projects with companies like eForge solutions and SAMS.

In 2017, Kabir made a move to the private sector to work in the area of health technology. She founded OTRAC, a health technology company that develops enterprise software systems for the healthcare sector in Nigeria. OTRAC was founded in 2017 and is currently active in Nigeria and South Africa.

Kabir is the current ambassador and team lead for Google Women TechMakers Abuja. Google Women TechMakers is a program that supports and encourage more women to get into the STEM field, and help those that are already in STEM. STEM stands for Science, Technology, Engineering and Mathematics.
She is one of 100 women named in Leading Ladies Africa (LLA)’s 100 Most Inspiring Women in Nigeria list for 2019.
In 2016, she was the only Nigerian among five Africans that was given an award by the French President, François Hollande, in recognition of her pioneering entrepreneurial strides in Health Technology.

Federal ICT advisor (2018–2019) 
Kabir served as the Federal ICT advisor for the Department of International Development (DFID)’s Partnership to Engage, Reform, and Learn (PERL) programme. This is a five-year project that focuses on strengthening government institutions and increasing citizen participation. This programme links governments and citizen groups to collectively address governance challenges for improved service delivery.

Other activities 

 Mentally Aware Nigeria Initiative, Member
 World Health Organization AFRO, Member of steering committee for developing and implementing framework for scaling health innovations across Africa
 Toastmasters International, Member
 Center for Strategic Enterprise Development, Board Member
 Africa Innovation Convention, Advisory Board
 Google Women Tech Makers Abuja, Ambassador and Team Lead

Recognition 

 Laureate du Digital Africa by French Development Agency (2017)
 Innoventor by Verdant Zeal Group (2017)
 Guardian Woman by Guardian Newspapers (2018)
 Nigeria's 100 most inspiring women by Leading Ladies Africa (2019)
 YTech100 by the Future Africa Project (2019)

Publications 

 From Zero to Mobile App - Building with Ionic Framework
 Mobile Heath and Telemedicine in Africa: Opportunities, Challenges, Modern Tools and Future Innovation
 Applying a Gender Lens to Young People's Access to Health Services: A transformative Approach
 21st Century Skills in ICT Business

References 

Living people
21st-century Nigerian women
Place of birth missing (living people)
Google employees
Ahmadu Bello University alumni
Nigerian chief executives
Women chief executives
1992 births